ŠK Senec was  a Slovak soccer club based in Senec, and founded in 1994. The club has played in Slovak Second Football League. Since 1999 the club has organized an annual youth soccer tournament Senec District and friends, which in the past ten years has involved 15,940 children. The club license of ŠK Senec was bought by city of Gabčíkovo and "ŠK Senec" as a club folded.

Clubname history 
 ŠK SFM Senec 1994–2014
 ŠK Senec 2014–2016

Affiliated clubs 

The following clubs were affiliated with ŠK.
  FC DAC 1904 Dunajská Streda (2013–2016)

Notable players 
Had international caps for their respective countries. Players whose name is listed in bold represented their countries while playing for Senec.

	
 Jésus Konnsimbal
 Pavol Majerník
 Juraj Piroska

Notable Managers 
 Branislav Kriška (2008–2010)
 Anton Jánoš (2010–2012)
 Marián Tibenský (2012–15.10.2013)
 Andrej Štellár (15.10.2013–7.1.2016)

References

Sources 
ŠK Senec – Official Site

External links 
 Official Site

Defunct football clubs in Slovakia
Association football clubs established in 1994
Association football clubs disestablished in 2016
1994 establishments in Slovakia